This is a list of Bulgarian football clubs in European competition. Bulgarian clubs have participated since 1956, when CSKA Sofia entered the 1956–57 European Cup.

Achievements

Biggest Achievements

Statistics
As of 3 November 2022.

 Most European Cup / Champions League competitions appeared in: 25 – CSKA Sofia 
 Most Inter-Cities Fairs Cup / UEFA Cup / Europa League competitions appeared in: 26 – Levski Sofia
 Most UEFA Europa Conference League competitions appeared in: 2 – CSKA Sofia
 Most Cup Winners' Cup competitions appeared in: 11 – Levski Sofia
 Most Intertoto Cup competitions appeared in: 5 – Spartak Varna
 Most competitions appeared in overall: 58 – CSKA Sofia
 First match played: CSKA Sofia  8–1 Dinamo București (1956–57 European Cup R1)
 Most matches played: 258 – CSKA Sofia
 Most match wins: 100 – CSKA Sofia
 Most match draws: 56 – CSKA Sofia 
 Most match losses: 94 – Levski Sofia

 Biggest win (match): 10 goals
 Levski Sofia 12–2 Lahden Reipas (1976–77 European Cup Winners' Cup R1) 
 Biggest win (aggregate): 16 goals
 Levski Sofia 19–3 Lahden Reipas (1976–77 European Cup Winners' Cup R1) 
 Biggest defeat (match): 8 goals
 Sigma Olomouc 8–0 Velbazhd Kyustendil (2000 UEFA Intertoto Cup R2)
 Biggest defeat (aggregate): 10 goals
 Slavia Sofia 0–10 Partizan (1988–89 UEFA Cup R1)

UEFA coefficient and ranking
For the 2020–21 UEFA competitions, the associations will be allocated places according to their 2019 UEFA country coefficients, which will take into account their performance in European competitions from 2014–15 to 2018–19. In the 2019 rankings that will be used for the 2020–21 European competitions, Bulgaria's coefficient points total is 17.500. After earning a score of 4.000 during the 2018–19 European campaign, Bulgaria is ranked by UEFA as the 28th best association in Europe out of 55.

 26  Azerbaijan 19.000
 27  Israel 18.625
 28  Bulgaria 17.500
 29  Romania 15.950
 30  Slovakia 15.625
 Full list

UEFA country coefficient history
(As of 2 September 2022), Source: Bert Kassies website.

Appearances in UEFA competitions

App. = Appearances; P = Matches played; W = Matches won; D = Matches drawn; L = Matches lost; EC = European Cup; UCL = UEFA Champions League; UC = UEFA Cup; UEL = UEFA Europa League; CWC = UEFA Cup Winners' Cup; UIC = UEFA Intertoto Cup.

Active competitions

European Cup / UEFA Champions League 

Notes
 Note 1: A number of Eastern European clubs withdrew from the first two rounds when UEFA paired up all of the Eastern European clubs against one another due to the disastrous situation in Czechoslovakia.
 Note 2: Botev Plovdiv were replaced Levski Sofia as the Sofia's club barred from entering the European competitions after the riots during the Bulgarian Cup final.
 Note 3: The Bulgarian clubs were not entered the Champions League during these seasons as a result of restructuring by UEFA, with entry to the competition limited to the continent's top 24 countries. The league champions entered the UEFA Cup instead.

UEFA Cup / Europa League

UEFA Europa Conference League

Defunct competitions

Cup Winners' Cup 

Notes
 Note 1: A number of Eastern European clubs withdrew following UEFA's decision to separate western and Eastern countries due to troubles in Czechoslovakia.
 Note 2: CSKA Sofia were barred from entering the European competitions after the riots during the Bulgarian Cup final.

UEFA Intertoto Cup 

Notes
 Note 1: No club was elected by Bulgarian Football Union for the participation in the tournament in that season.

References

External links
UEFA Website
Rec.Sport.Soccer Statistics Foundation

European football clubs in international competitions